The National Museum of Natural History (NMNH) is a museum in Washington, D.C.

NMNH may also refer to:
National Museum of Natural History, New Delhi
Naranjo Museum of Natural History, in Lufkin, Texas

See also
National Museum of Natural History (disambiguation)